Ray Vinci Sadeghi (born April 1, 1982),  known professionally as Jizzy Mack, is an professional bodyguard from Las Vegas.

He is best known for being the personal bodyguard to American professional boxing promoter and retired professional boxer Floyd Mayweather Jr.

|1
| Loss
|0–1
|style="text-align:left;"|Floyd Mayweather Jr.
| 
| 2 (3), 
|Sep 25, 2022
|style="text-align:left;"|

Career 
At the age of 15, Ray Sadeghi and his family moved to New York City. Shortly after moving to America, he found himself on his own struggling to eat. In a recent interview with Respect, Sadeghi spoke of how these early life struggles as a teenager encouraged him to be a fighter and protect people. In 2009, before becoming a bodyguard, he went to medical school in Poland and became a dentist. In 2013, he became a professional bodyguard to Floyd Mayweather Jr.

He is also known for being outspoken to the media about MMA fighter Conor McGregor. In July 2017, Sadeghi interviewed with American writer Elie Seckbach on McGregor's fighting abilities. In October 2017, he gained national attention by being outspoken about a possible Floyd Mayweather Jr. and Conor McGregor rematch. Early in 2018, Sadeghi and his fellow bodyguard Greg LaRosa, who call themselves the Brixx Brothers, developed a Cannabidiol oil to help cancer patients. In October 2018, in an exclusive video by TMZ, Sagedhi gained national attention by saying he would have fought the late Bruce Lee in order to protect Mayweather.

He fought an exhibition boxing bout in the comain event of Super Rizin   versus Kouzi. Although a bodyguard, he was unable to demonstrate any sort of boxing skill versus the significantly lighter fighter, and lost by Technical Knockout in the 3rd round after being knocked down.

Filmography 

Television

Discography

Albums

References

External links 

1982 births
Living people

Bodyguards
American people of Iranian descent